In financial mathematics, a deviation risk measure is a function to quantify financial risk (and not necessarily downside risk) in a different method than a general risk measure. Deviation risk measures generalize the concept of standard deviation.

Mathematical definition
A function , where  is the L2 space of random variables (random portfolio returns), is a deviation risk measure if
 Shift-invariant:  for any 
 Normalization: 
 Positively homogeneous:  for any  and 
 Sublinearity:  for any 

Relation to risk measure
There is a one-to-one relationship between a deviation risk measure D and an expectation-bounded risk measure R where for any 
 
 .

If  for every X (where  is the essential infimum), then there is a relationship between D and a coherent risk measure.

Examples
The most well-known examples of risk deviation measures are:
Standard deviation ;
Average absolute deviation ;

See also
Unitized risk

References

Financial risk modeling